Potworów  is a village in Przysucha County, Masovian Voivodeship, in east-central Poland. It is the seat of the gmina (administrative district) called Gmina Potworów.

The village has a population of 990.

References

Villages in Przysucha County